Borchert's epochs refer to five distinct periods in the history of American urbanization and are also known as Borchert's model of urban evolution. Each epoch is characterized by the impact of a particular transport technology on the creation and differential rates of growth of American cities. This model was conceptualized by University of Minnesota geographer John R. Borchert (about) in 1967. The five epochs identified by Borchert are:

Sail-Wagon Epoch (1790–1830), cities grow near ports and major waterways which are used for transportation;
Iron Horse Epoch (1830–70), characterized by impact of steam engine technology, and development of steamboats and regional railroad networks;
Steel Rail Epoch (1870–1920), dominated by the development of long haul railroads and a national railroad network;
Auto-Air-Amenity Epoch (1920–70), with growth in the gasoline combustion engine;
High-Technology Epoch (1970–present), expansion in service and information sectors of the economy

Subsequent researchers (e.g., Phillips and Brunn) have proposed an extension of Borchert's model with new epochs to take into account late 20th-century developments in patterns of metropolitan growth and decline in the United States.

References

Borchert, John R. “Futures of American Cities.” In Our Changing Cities, edited by John Fraser Hart, 218–50. Baltimore, MD: The Johns Hopkins University Press, 1991.

External links
Macalester College: Concepts of Urbanization

Urban planning in the United States
Urban geography